The Netherlands Antilles competed at the 1964 Summer Olympics in Tokyo, Japan. Four competitors, all men, took part in four events in two sports.

Fencing

One fencer represented the Netherlands Antilles in 1964.

Men's sabre
 Jan Boutmy

Weightlifting

References

External links
Official Olympic Reports

Nations at the 1964 Summer Olympics
1964
1964 in the Netherlands Antilles